Sanjay Kumar Jha (also known as Sanjay Jha; born 1 December 1967) is an Indian politician who served as Minister of Water Resources twice in Government of Bihar and serving as Member of Bihar Legislative Council.

Personal life 
He was born on 1 December 1967 in Madhubani district. He earned a Master of Arts degree from Jawaharlal Nehru University.

References 

1967 births
Living people
Members of the Bihar Legislative Council